Pselnophorus vilis is a moth of the family Pterophoridae. It known from Japan (Hokkaido, Honshu, Kyushu, Tanega-shima, Yaku-shima), Amur, Korea and China.

The larvae feed on Ligularia fisheri, Ligularia tussilaginea and Petasites japonicus. When feeding on Ligularia tussilaginea, the larva usually eats the leaf from the upper surface and the lower epidermis is left untouched. Rarely, the larva eats the leaf from the under surface. The pupa is usually attached to the upper surface of a leaf. When feeding on Ligularia fisheri, the larva eats the leaf from the upper or under surface and eats large patches, here the epidermis is not left.

References

External links
Taxonomic And Biological Studies Of Pterophoridae Of Japan (Lepidoptera)
Japanese Moths

Oidaematophorini
Moths described in 1881
Moths of Asia
Moths of Japan